Ballyvaughan parish is a parish in County Clare and part of the Kilfenora Deanery of the Roman Catholic Diocese of Galway, Kilmacduagh and Kilfenora. It is located in the northern side of The Burren, bordering Galway Bay.

Current (2021) parish priest is Richard Flanagan.

The parish is an amalgamation of the former parishes of Drumcreehy, Gleninagh, Kilonaghan and Rathborney.

The main church of Ballyvaughan parish is the Church of Saint John the Baptist in Ballyvaughan, build and twice rebuild after damaging storms in the period 1858–1866. The second church of the parish is the Church of St. Patrick in Fanore. Building started in 1866 and dedication was in 1870.

References

Parishes of the Roman Catholic Diocese of Galway, Kilmacduagh and Kilfenora